The following page lists the power stations in Russia.

Renewable

Geothermal

Hydroelectric

Pumped-storage hydroelectric

Solar photovoltaic 
The following is a list of photovoltaic power stations in Russia:

In addition there are distributed PV systems on rooftops and PV installations in off-grid locations.

Tidal

Wind 

Three large wind power stations (25, 19, and 15 GWt) became available to Russia after it took over the disputed territory of Crimea in May 2014. Built by Ukraine, these stations are not yet shown in the table above.

Non-renewable

Nuclear

Thermal

See also 

Energy policy of Russia
List of power stations in Europe
List of largest power stations in the world

Notes

References 

Russia
 
Power stations